The 1996 World Women's Curling Championship (branded as 1996 Ford World Women's Curling Championship for sponsorship reasons) was held at Copps Coliseum in Hamilton, Ontario, Canada from March 23–31, 1996.

Teams

Round robin standings

Round robin results

Draw 1

Draw 2

Draw 3

Draw 4

Draw 5

Draw 6

Draw 7

Draw 8

Draw 9

Tiebreaker

Playoffs

Brackets

Final

References
 

World Women's Curling Championship
Sports competitions in Hamilton, Ontario
Ford World Women's Curling Championship, 1996
Curling in Ontario
Ford World Women's Curling Championship
Ford World Women's Curling Championship
Ford World Championship
Ford World Curling Championship
Women's curling competitions in Canada
20th century in Hamilton, Ontario
International sports competitions hosted by Canada